Michel Danino (born 4 June 1956) is a French-born Indian writer. He is a guest professor at IIT Gandhinagar and has been a member of the Indian Council of Historical Research. In 2017, Government of India conferred Padma Shri, the fourth-highest civilian honor for his contribution towards Literature & Education.

Life in India 
Danino spent a few years in Auroville, Tamil Nadu before shifting to the Nilgiri mountains, where he resided for two decades. In 2003, he settled near Coimbatore and accepted Indian citizenship.

Work and reception 
Danino wrote The Lost River: On The Trail of the Sarasvati (2010), which tentatively identified the legendary Sarasvati River, mentioned in Rigveda with the current Ghaggar-Hakra River. V Rajamani over Current Science reviewed it in favorable terms and praised Danino for his meticulous research.

Peter Heehs's opinion of one of Danino's works, Sri Aurobindo and Indian Civilization, is that it was lacking in linguistic knowledge, and being made up by attacks on colonial orientalists and half-informed invocations of nationalist orientalists. Heehs also criticized Danino's other works for appropriating Sri Aurobindo in his campaign against the Indo-Aryan migrations, and for distorting Aurobindo's speculative views as assertions. Heehs added that Danino selectively cherry-picked quotes from his draft-manuscripts and ignored his published works, which were far more nuanced. Others have accused Danino of pursuing a sectarian Hindutva oriented scholarship based on historical negationism.

Danino was a contributing author to an encyclopedic volume by Wiley-Blackwell, on South Asian history and archaeology, about the domain of Indus Valley civilisation.

See also 
Indigenous Aryanists

References

External links 

Michel Danino homepage at IIT-G 

1956 births
Living people
20th-century Indian writers
21st-century Indian writers
French emigrants to India
Naturalised citizens of India
Indian people of French descent
French Indologists
Indian Indologists
Indian spiritual writers
French spiritual writers
Indigenous Aryanists
Recipients of the Padma Shri in literature & education
20th-century French writers